Disnensky Uyezd (Дисненский уезд) was one of the seven subdivisions of the Vilna Governorate of the Russian Empire. It was situated in the northeastern part of the governorate (in present-day northern Belarus). Its administrative centre was Dzisna (Disna). The territory of Disnensky Uyezd corresponds to a part of the present-day Vitebsk Region.

Demographics
At the time of the Russian Empire Census of 1897, Disnensky Uyezd had a population of 204,923. Of these, 81.1% spoke Belarusian, 10.1% Yiddish, 5.9% Russian, 2.4% Polish, 0.3% Lithuanian, 0.1% German and 0.1% Latvian as their native language.

References

 
Uezds of Vilna Governorate
Vilna Governorate